Borowe may refer to:

Borowe, Gmina Mogielnica in Masovian Voivodeship (east-central Poland)
Borowe, Gmina Warka in Masovian Voivodeship (east-central Poland)
Borowe, Podlaskie Voivodeship (north-east Poland)
Borowe, Mława County in Masovian Voivodeship (east-central Poland)
Borowe, Ostrów Mazowiecka County in Masovian Voivodeship (east-central Poland)
Borowe, Greater Poland Voivodeship (west-central Poland)
Borowe, Silesian Voivodeship (south Poland)
Borowe, Lubusz Voivodeship (west Poland)
Borowe, Warmian-Masurian Voivodeship (north Poland)